The 2022 CS Warsaw Cup was held on November 17–20 in Warsaw, Poland. It was part of the 2022–23 ISU Challenger Series. Medals were awarded in the disciplines of men's singles, women's singles, pair skating, and ice dance.

Entries 
The International Skating Union published the full list of entries on October 26, 2022.

Changes to preliminary assignments

Results

Men

Women

Pairs

Ice dance

References

External links 
 Warsaw Cup at the International Skating Union

Warsaw Cup
Warsaw Cup
CS Warsaw Cup
CS Warsaw Cup